Arthur Henry Fromme (September 3, 1883 – August 24, 1956) was a professional baseball player who pitched in the Major Leagues from -. He played for the St. Louis Cardinals, Cincinnati Reds and New York Giants.

External links

1883 births
1956 deaths
Major League Baseball pitchers
Baseball players from Illinois
St. Louis Cardinals players
Cincinnati Reds players
New York Giants (NL) players
Springfield Senators players
Venice Tigers players
Vernon Tigers players
Sportspeople from Quincy, Illinois
Burials at Rose Hills Memorial Park